The 1951 Kurşunlu earthquake occurred at 18:33 GMT (20:33 local time) on 13 August near Kurşunlu, Çankırı Province, Central Anatolia Region, Turkey. The earthquake was one of a series of major and intermediate quakes that have occurred in modern times along the North Anatolian Fault since 1939.

It had a magnitude of 6.9 on the surface wave magnitude scale and a maximum felt intensity of IX (Violent) on the Mercalli intensity scale. There were 50 casualties and 3,354 injuries.

See also
 List of earthquakes in 1951
 List of earthquakes in Turkey

References

External links

1951 Kursunlu
1951 earthquakes
1951 in Turkey
History of Çankırı Province
August 1951 events in Asia
1951 disasters in Turkey